Charles J. Symmonds (October 6, 1866 – July 16, 1941) was a brigadier general in the United States Army. He was awarded the Army Distinguished Service Medal.

His award citation reads:

The President of the United States of America, authorized by Act of Congress, July 9, 1918, takes pleasure in presenting the Army Distinguished Service Medal to Colonel (Cavalry) Charles J. Symmonds, United States Army, for exceptionally meritorious and distinguished services to the Government of the United States, in a duty of great responsibility during World War I. Colonel Symmonds Commanded for many months the important Intermediate Storage Depot at Gievres. He successfully administered a large personnel and supervised the growth of Gievres as a storage depot. He organized the system of supply from that station so efficiently that there were not shortages, either for food or material, at the regulating stations dependent upon Gievres for supply during all the active operations.

Symmonds' official residence was listed as Kenosha, Wisconsin. He graduated from the United States Military Academy in 1888 and served in the Spanish–American War and World War I. After the war he was a cavalry commander at Fort Bliss, Texas, and then for two years was the commandant of the cavalry school at Fort Riley, Kansas. Symmonds is buried at Arlington National Cemetery.

References

1866 births
1941 deaths
Military personnel from Wisconsin
American military personnel of the Spanish–American War
United States Army personnel of World War I
People from Kenosha, Wisconsin
Recipients of the Distinguished Service Medal (US Army)
United States Army generals
United States Military Academy alumni
Burials at Arlington National Cemetery